The Lucanians were an Italic tribe living in Lucania, in what is now southern Italy, who spoke an Oscan language, a member of the Italic languages. Today, the inhabitants of the Basilicata region are still called Lucani, and so their dialect.

Language and writing
The Lucani spoke a variety of the Umbrian-Oscan language, like their neighbours, the Samnites, who had absorbed the Osci in the 5th century BC. The few Oscan inscriptions and coins in the area that survive from the 4th or 3rd century BC use the Greek alphabet.

History

Around the middle of the 5th century BC, the Lucani moved south into Oenotria, driving the indigenous tribes, known to the Greeks as Oenotrians, Chones, and Lauternoi, into the mountainous interior.

The Lucanians were engaged in hostilities with the Greek colony of Taras/Tarentum, and with Alexander, king of Epirus, who was called in by the Tarentine people to their assistance, in 334 BC, thus providing a precedent for Epirote interference in the affairs of Magna Graecia. In 331, treacherous Lucanian exiles killed Alexander of Epirus.

In 298, Livy records, they made alliance with Rome, and Roman influence was extended by the colonies of Venusia (291), Paestum (Greek Posidonia, refounded in 273), and above all Roman Tarentum (refounded in 272). Subsequently, however, the Lucanians suffered by choosing the losing side in the various wars on the peninsula in which Rome took part. They were sometimes in alliance with Rome, but more frequently engaged in hostilities, during the Samnite wars.

When Pyrrhus of Epirus landed in Italy in 281,  they were among the first to declare in his favor, and after his abrupt departure they were reduced to subjection, in a ten-year campaign (272). Enmity continued to run deep; they espoused the cause of Hannibal during the Second Punic War (216), and Lucania was ravaged by both armies during several campaigns. The country never recovered from these disasters, and under the Roman government fell into decay, to which the Social War, in which the Lucanians took part with the Samnites against Rome (91 - 88 BC), gave the finishing stroke.

In the time of Strabo (63 BC – 24 AD) the Greek cities on the coast had fallen into insignificance and, owing to the decrease of population and cultivation, malaria began to obtain the upper hand. The few towns of the interior were of no importance. A large part of the province was given up to pasture, and the mountains were covered with forests, which abounded in wild boars, bears and wolves.

Art

Lucanian art mainly survives in Lucanian vase painting and paintings from tombs, which the elite commissioned in rather large numbers, like the Etruscans but unlike their Roman and Greek neighbours. There is a good display in the museum at Paestum. A high proportion feature horses, often racing.  Vase painting was practiced between about 420 BC and 335 BC, and at its height vases were exported to all Apulia.  The painters, some of whom have been assigned notnames, were probably Greek emigres, or trained in Greece - probably Athens to judge by their styles.

See also
List of ancient Italic peoples

Notes

Osci
Lucania
Socii

External links
 - Source texts of ancient Greek and Roman authors

 - Strabo's work The Geography (Geographica). Books 5 and 6 are about Italy (each region has a chapter).